For the former long-term mayor of Laredo, Texas, see J. C. Martin (Texas politician).

Joseph Clifton Martin (born December 13, 1936) is a former Major League Baseball player.

Chicago White Sox
Splitting time between first and third base, Martin batted .230 with five home runs and 32 runs batted in.

Regular catcher Sherm Lollar was at the tail end of his career at the age of 37; moreover, the White Sox had traded Earl Battey and Johnny Romano and had no catchers in their farm system.

In , Martin batted a career-best .261, however, he also set a major league record with 33 passed balls (after committing 24 the year before)—due, in large part, to catching knuckleball pitchers Hoyt Wilhelm and Eddie Fisher.

In , Martin batted .234 on a team that was involved in a four-way pennant race with the Minnesota Twins, Detroit Tigers and Boston Red Sox for the American League pennant, which the latter of these teams won on the final day of the season. The White Sox finished three games behind. After the season, the White Sox traded Martin to the New York Mets to complete a deal that had been made earlier in the season for Ken Boyer. In another deal that same offseason, the White Sox traded Tommie Agee and Al Weis to the Mets with four players (among them Tommy Davis and Jack Fisher) going to the White Sox.

Martin caught Joe Horlen's no-hitter on September 10 of that 1967 season.

New York Mets
In  Martin, as one of two backup catchers to Jerry Grote (the other was Duffy Dyer), played on a Mets team that shockingly won the National League East title (both leagues now had two divisions after expanding from 10 teams to 12) after trailing the Chicago Cubs by as many as 10 games in August. In Game One of the first-ever NLCS, which the Mets swept over the Atlanta Braves, Martin, pinch-hitting for Tom Seaver, drove in Weis and Ed Kranepool with a base-hit off Phil Niekro during a five-run eighth inning, the Mets winning the game 9–5. The Mets went on to win the World Series in equally surprising fashion, in five games over the heavily favored Baltimore Orioles.

In Game Four of that Series, his Mets leading two games to one, Martin was involved in a controversial play. With the game tied 1–1 in the bottom of the 10th and pinch-runner Rod Gaspar on second, Martin, again pinch-hitting for Seaver, bunted to the mound and, while running to first, was hit on the arm by Pete Richert’s errant throw, the error allowing Gaspar to score the winning run. Replays later showed that Martin had been running inside the baseline, which could have resulted in him being called out for interference. The umpires said they did not make the call, however, because they felt Martin did not intentionally interfere with the play. As a result of this play, the running lane that extends from halfway down the first-base line to the bag was added to all major league fields. A runner can be running in this lane and be hit by a thrown ball and not be called for interference.

Chicago Cubs
Martin was traded to the Chicago Cubs on March 29, for catcher Randy Bobb.

In his career Martin batted .222 with 32 home runs and 230 RBIs in 908 games played.

References

External links

J. C. Martin at SABR (Baseball BioProject)

1936 births
Living people
Baseball players from Virginia
Chicago Cubs coaches
Chicago Cubs players
Chicago White Sox announcers
Chicago White Sox players
Davenport DavSox players
Dubuque Packers players
Duluth-Superior White Sox players
Holdrege White Sox players
Indianapolis Indians players
Lynchburg White Sox players
Major League Baseball broadcasters
Major League Baseball catchers
Major League Baseball controversies
Minor league baseball managers
New York Mets players
People from Henry County, Virginia
Rapiños de Occidente players
Sportspeople from Wheaton, Illinois
Wheaton Thunder baseball coaches
Wichita Aeros players